The men's 4 × 400 metres relay at the 2012 IAAF World Indoor Championships will be held at the Ataköy Athletics Arena on 10 and 11 March.

Medalists

* Runners who participated only in the heats and received medals.

Records

Schedule

Results

Heats
Qualification: First 2 of each heat (Q) plus the 2 fastest times (q) advance to the final.

11 teams from 11 countries participated.  One country did not start the competition.  With two heats competing, the qualification round started at 11:20 and 11:33.

Final
Started at 17:40.

References

Relay 4x400 metres
4 × 400 metres relay at the World Athletics Indoor Championships